Kursail is a small village inhibited on the shore of river Bakara under Araria district in the Indian state of Bihar. It has two middle schools and two primary schools.

Culture

Language  
Hindi and Urdu are the main languages of the people of Kursail, however some people speak Maithili as well.

Cuisine  
The main food is rice (boiled) and roti (flatbread) with dal (Pulses) and locally available vegetables (cabbages, gourds, pumpkins, lady's finger etc.).  Dahi (curd), cheura (flattened rice) are also very popular among people. People are fond of non-vegetarian food as well. Kursail being near to Bakra river and lake Futung, fishes are readily available. Even people has their own ponds to culture fish. In sweet dishes jalebis and rasgullas, laddu and pedas are very much liked by people.

Festivals  
Eid, Chhatt Pooja, Durga Pooja, Kali Pooja, Lakshami Pooja, Muharram are the main festivals of residents of Kursail. All festivals are celebrated by both Hindu and Muslim communities without any discrimination.

Population  
The population of Kursail is approximately two thousand.

Nearest railway station  
Araria Court
Kishanganj

Nearest Airport  
Bagdogra International Airport

Nearest national highways 
NH-57(15 km approx), NH 31 (30 km approx.), NH 34 (32 km approx)

References 

Villages in Araria district